Indian Chief was an American vessel that appeared in Lloyd's Register (LR) in 1797 but was destroyed in a fire in that year.

On 18 January 1797 Indian Chief, Shaw, master, was at Falmouth when she caught fire. She had a cargo of 1200 casks of pilchards that she was to take to the Straits of Gibraltar. Indian Chief had come from Cornwall.

Citations

1790s ships
Ships built in the United States
Age of Sail merchant ships of the United States
Maritime incidents in 1797
Ship fires
Shipwrecks of England